A European Long Term Investment Fund (ELTIF) is a type of regulated fund introduced in the European Union to encourage investment into companies and projects who need long-term capital, for example infrastructure projects. They are aimed at both institutional and private investors in Europe.

As of November 2021, 57 ELTIFs had been registered in only 4 member states: Luxembourg, France, Italy and Spain.

In the United Kingdom, it is expected that Long-Term Asset Funds (LTAF) will replace ELTIF in 2023.

Sources 

Investment funds